Coco's Bakery is a subsidiary chain of Shari's Cafe & Pies and casual dining restaurants operating in the western United States. As of March 2023, the company operates 13 locations in Arizona and California. It began as The Snack Shop in 1948 in Corona del Mar, California, and had switched owners multiple times.

History

In 1948, The Snack Shop along the Pacific Coast Highway in Corona del Mar, California, was purchased by John and Audrey McIntosh. John and Audrey decided to purchase the restaurant after he had worked there for two weeks. In partnership with his brother-in-law Bill McIntyre, they grew the Snack Shop concept to many more units and then in 1960 expanded the business into Reuben's in Newport Beach. Then in 1965 they expanded the Snack Shop concept to Coco's and the Reuben E. Lee, ultimately converting all Snack Shops to Coco's. As the name implies, the bakery-restaurants feature pies. After the conversion of the Snack Shops to Coco's locations, as well the newly expanded Reuben's steakhouse franchise that were co-located on Coco's properties, the entire operation was sold to W. R. Grace and Company, a New York chemical conglomerate, as part of its Restaurant Services Division.  During this period of Grace ownership, Grace also added local Mexican restaurant chain El Torito, Carrows and many others.

After years of poor performance, W. R. Grace spun off 145 restaurant locations in a leveraged buyout to Restaurant Enterprises Group, a company composed of Grace managers. 

On May 24, 1996, Coco's and Carrows were later sold to Flagstar, the parent company of Denny's. On July 12, 1997, Flagstar filed for Chapter 11 bankruptcy. 

On February 15, 2001, Coco's and Carrows new owners, FRD Acquisition Co., filed for Chapter 11 bankruptcy.

In 2002, Coco's, along with its sister chain Carrows, was purchased by Catalina Restaurant Group, headquartered in Carlsbad, California. In 2006, Catalina Restaurant Group was bought by Japanese company Zensho Co., Ltd., which has operated Coco's Japan for many years.

In 2015 San Antonio, Texas-based Food Management Partners acquired Carlsbad, California-based Catalina Restaurant Group Inc., parent of the Coco's and Carrows concepts, from Zensho Co., Ltd. See also :ja:ココスジャパン (Coco's Japan Co., Ltd).

In September 2018, it was announced that Shari's Cafe & Pies had taken over Carrows and Coco's.

Competition
In California, Coco's Bakery Restaurant and sister chain Carrows compete with other local casual restaurants with an in-store bakery (or a sales counter), such as Hof's Hut, Polly's Pies and Marie Callender's restaurants.

References

External links
 

Companies based in Carlsbad, California
Economy of the Southwestern United States
Regional restaurant chains in the United States
Fast-food chains of the United States
Bakeries of the United States
Restaurants established in 1948
Bakery cafés
Restaurant franchises
Restaurants in San Diego County, California
1948 establishments in California
Companies that filed for Chapter 11 bankruptcy in 1997
Companies that filed for Chapter 11 bankruptcy in 2001